KKHP-LP was a radio station licensed to and serving Oroville, California. KKHP-LP was last owned and operated by Blue Feather Media Group. The station's license was surrendered to the Federal Communications Commission and cancelled on January 4, 2023.

References

External links
97.1 KHP Online

2014 establishments in California
2023 disestablishments in California
Defunct radio stations in the United States
Radio stations established in 2014
Radio stations disestablished in 2023
KHP-LP
KHP-LP
KHP-LP